Route 99 is a state highway in Connecticut running for  from Route 9 in Cromwell, through the town of Rocky Hill, ending in Wethersfield at the Hartford city line. The road continues into Hartford as a local road (Wethersfield Avenue).  It follows the former alignment of Route 9 from prior to that route's upgrade to a freeway.

Route description
Route 99 begins as the northbound Exit 18 ramp of Route 9 in Cromwell. At the end of the off ramp, the road continues north as Main Street. (Access from Main Street to the southbound on-ramp for Route 9 is designated as State Road 901). At the junction with Elm Street (Route 160), the road becomes a four-lane road known as the Silas Deane Highway. The Silas Deane Highway continues through Rocky Hill up to the town of Wethersfield. It serves as the main thoroughfare of these two towns, also providing access to several shopping centers. Route 99 has interchanges with Interstate 91 in Rocky Hill and the Wilbur Cross Highway (Route 15) in Wethersfield. At the Hartford city line, Route 99 ends but the road continues into downtown Hartford as Wethersfield Avenue.

The entire length of Route 99 is also known as the George Washington Memorial Highway.

History
The alignment of Route 99 was originally designated as part of New England Interstate Route 10 in the 1920s. The Silas Deane Highway was built in 1930 and New England Route 10 was shifted slightly west to use the new highway. In the 1932 state highway renumbering, the alignment was re-designated as Route 9. When Route 9 was upgraded to an expressway between  I-91 and I-95 in 1969, the old surface alignment became Route 99.

Junction list

References

External links

Conn. Rt. 99 Photo

099
Transportation in Hartford County, Connecticut
Transportation in Middlesex County, Connecticut